Winnie Gofit also known as Winifred Gofit (born May 22, 1994) is a Nigerian freestyle wrestler. She is a gold medalist of the African Championships in 2017 and 2018. She is also a silver medallist of Commonwealth Wrestling Championship.

Winnie is included in the Nigerian Judo Hall Of Fame as the Highest ranked woman in Nigerian Judo Federation.

Sports career 
In 2017, she won the gold medal in the women's freestyle 75 kg event at the 2017 African Wrestling Championships held in Marrakesh, Morocco.

Also in 2017, she represented Commonwealth Wrestling Championship held in Johannesburg, South Africa and she won the silver medal in the women's freestyle 72 kg event.

In 2018, she won the gold medal in the women's freestyle 72 kg event at the 2018 African Wrestling Championships held in Port Harcourt, Nigeria.

References 

Nigerian female sport wrestlers
1994 births
Living people
African Wrestling Championships medalists
21st-century Nigerian women